Gholam Ali Safai Bushehri (Persian: غلامعلی صفایی بوشهری) (born: 1959, Bushehr) is an Iranian Twelver Shia cleric who is the representative of Vali-e-Faqih (Guardianship of the Islamic Jurist) in Bushehr Province, and the Imam of Friday Prayer in Bushehr, who has been appointed to these positions by the decree of Vali-e-Faqih, Seyyed Ali Khamenei—the supreme leader of Iran.

Safai (Safayi) Bushehri was born on 22 March 1959, in the city of Bushehr in a religious family. He graduated from his elementary school in Baqeri School, and was educated at the high school of Sa'adat. This Shia cleric moved to Qom in 1983, and was educated there at Hawzah; and also taught there. Gholam Ali studied for about 17 years. Later on, he went to the school of Dar-al-Shafa', and got married at that time and has two daughters and a son. Safai Bushehri has the record of teaching at Hawzah, etc.

Compilations 
 Simaye Tarikhe Eslam
 Tarjome Va Sharhe Moghni Al-Adib
 Amoozeshe Moghadamati Nahv
 Tarjome Sahife Sajadieh
 Al-Motoon Lel-Taalim Va Al-Tadrib
 Chehel Cheraghe Asemane Esmat
 Al-Nahv Al-Tatbighi
 Bedaye Al-Nahv
 Amoozeshe Sarf
 Raveshe Tahsile Adabiate Arab
 Tajzieh Va Tarkib
 Badat Al-Tamarin
 Dastanhaye Asemani
 Vaghte Zohoor Nazdik Ast
 Moghni Al-Adib

See also 
 Qom Seminary
 Abdul-Nabi Namazi

References 

Representatives of the Supreme Leader in the Provinces of Iran
Iranian ayatollahs
1959 births
Living people